Johnny Holiday (born in Memphis, Tennessee, United States), billed professionally as "Johnny Holiday" is an American, writer, actor, and musician who began his career at the age of 15. He played Carl Perkins in the Johnny Cash bio movie Walk the Line starring Joaquin Phoenix and Reese Witherspoon.

Biography
As a rock and blues musician, Johnny made his mark on Beale Street in Memphis, Tennessee, at the age of 15. His first record made was at Sun Studio. His first appearance on stage was at the Overton Park Shell. When Beale Street opened as a tourist attraction in the 1980s, a very young  Johnny along with his band Kid Memphis & The Mojo Hand Band started doing regular shows at the New Daisy Theater. Shortly after that Johnny played alongside musicians such as, B.B. King, Albert King, Albert Collins, Gatemouth Brown, Anson Funderburgh, Willie "Big Eyes" Smith, Cash McCall, Jeff Healey and more. Johnny was reportedly influenced by some of the early Texas recording artists. Holiday became an actor in 2005. He has since released a record with Little Boys Blue on Vizztone Records, operated by Bob Margolin, and in 2020, Johnny has released a record of his own via Retrofonic, recorded at American Sound Studio.

See also
 God of Metal
 Walk the Line
 Sun Records (TV series)

References

External links

 Official website

1977 births
American male film actors
American male television actors
American male musicians
Male actors from Los Angeles
Living people